Crosscanonby is a civil parish in the Borough of Allerdale in Cumbria, England.  It contains 16 listed buildings that are recorded in the National Heritage List for England.  Of these, one is listed at Grade I, the highest of the three grades, and the others are at Grade II, the lowest grade.  The parish contains the villages of Crosscanonby, Crosby and Birkby, and the surrounding countryside.  The listed buildings consist of houses and cottages, and associated buildings, a church and a war memorial.


Key

Buildings

References

Citations

Sources

Lists of listed buildings in Cumbria